Dharmarajika Buddhist Monastery Complex is a Buddhist Monastery (Vihara) that is located in Dhaka, Bangladesh and is the first Buddhist Monastery (Vihara) that was built in Dhaka.

History

Dharmarajika Buddhist Monastery Complex' was built in 1960 and since then it is the center of Buddhist life and culture in Dhaka and Bangladesh. It housed the Dharmarajik Pali College which was established in 1960 as well. In 1962 King Bhumibol of Thailand visited the temple, the first foreign head of state to do so. In 1984 Thailand donated a 10 feet tall statue of Buddha and then Japan donated another statue. The temple acted as shelter during Bangladesh Liberation war, and Dharmarajik Orphanage was created after the Independence of Bangladesh. In 1972 Dharmarajika High School was established. In 1993 the temple established Dharmarajik Technical School and Dharmarajika Kindergarten. Dharmarajika Fine Arts Academy was established in 1995 and 1996 Dharmarajika Nikkiuniyano Clinic was established along with Dharmarajika Literary Society and Dharmarajika Orphanage.

References

Buddhist monasteries in Bangladesh
1960 establishments in East Pakistan
Organisations based in Dhaka